The banded parisoma (Curruca boehmi), banded tit warbler or banded warbler, is a species of Old World warbler in the family Sylviidae.
It is found in Ethiopia, Kenya, Somalia, and Tanzania.
Its natural habitat is dry savanna.

Measuring  in length, this bird is identified as gray on top, white below, with a dark chest band. The bird has variable spotting on the throat, white patches on his wing and outer tail, and buff coloring on the belly and undertail.

Subspecies
Subspecies listed alphabetically:
C. b. boehmi (Reichenow, 1882) – S Kenya and NE, C & SW Tanzania
C. b. marsabit (van Someren, 1931) – NC Kenya
C. b. somalica (Friedmann, 1928) – NC, E & SW Ethiopia, NW Somalia and NE Kenya

References

External links
Banded parisoma, Tanzania Birds
Parisoma boehmi, ZipCodeZoo

banded parisoma
Birds of East Africa
banded parisoma
Taxonomy articles created by Polbot